Infestation is a comic book crossover published by IDW Publishing, and connecting various of its licensed and original series together. It was published from January to April 2011. It consisted of two book-end one-shots, Infestation #1–2, set in the Zombies vs. Robots and CVO universes, and two-issue limited series from the G.I. Joe, Transformers, Ghostbusters, and Star Trek universes. Also, IDW published a digital-only Pocket God tie-in issue in May 2011 which was included in the hardcover book.

IDW then released a four-issue epilogue series titled Infestation: Outbreak from June 2011 – September 2011. It picked up on the CVO after the events of Infestation and also introduced the events of the Groom Lake limited series into the same continuity of the CVO. IDW also published a four-issue follow-up series set in the Zombies vs. Robots universe after the events of Infestation, entitled Zombies vs. Robots: UnderCity.

Premise
Britt (from CVO: Covert Vampiric Operations) comes in contact with the Undermind (from Zombies vs. Robots) to bring armies of zombies across the universes of Star Trek, The Transformers, Ghostbusters, G.I. Joe, and pocket god.

Titles

Infestation #1
Published in January 2011. Written by Dan Abnett and Andy Lanning with art by David Messina.

Star Trek: Infestation #1-2
Published biweekly in February 2011. Written by Scott Tipton and David Tipton with art by Casey Maloney.

The Transformers: Infestation #1-2
Published biweekly in February 2011. Written by Dan Abnett and Andy Lanning with art by Nick Roche.

Ghostbusters: Infestation #1-2
Published biweekly in March 2011. Written by Erik Burnham with art by Kyle Hotz.

G.I. Joe: Infestation #1-2
Published biweekly in March 2011. Written by Mike Raicht with art by Giovanni Timpano.

Infestation #2
Published in April 2011. Written by Dan Abnett and Andy Lanning with art by David Messina.

Infestation: CVO 100-Page Spectacular
Published in April 2011. A repackaging of older CVO comics.

Pocket God: Infestation #1
Published in digital format only in May 2011. First in print in the Infestation hardcover.

Zombies vs. Robots: UnderCity #1-4
Published monthly from April 2011 - July 2011. Written by Chris Ryall with art by Mark Torres.

Infestation: Outbreak #1-4
Published monthly from June 2011 - September 2011. Written by Chris Ryall and Tom Waltz with art by David Messina.

Collected editions
The series has been collected into a number of trade paperbacks:

Preludes

Original series

Epilogue series

References

IDW Publishing titles
2011 comics debuts
2011 comics endings
G.I. Joe comics
Ghostbusters comics
Comics based on Star Trek
Transformers comics
Comics about parallel universes